The Austrian national American football team is the official American football senior national team of Austria. Its players are mostly recruited from the Austrian Football League but a few also play in other European leagues, mostly the German Football League.

European Championship record

The team placed third at the 1995 European Championship of American football (hosted by Austria) and also third place in the 2010 European Championship.

The Team placed second at the 2014 European Championship (hosted in Austria), losing the final in double overtime to Germany in front of 27000 spectators at Vienna's Ernst-Happel-Stadion and placed second again in 2018.

The 2021 European Championship of American football was less successful for Austria as they unexpectedly lost against  Italy in the group phase and thus only placed fifth overall. Austria also placed fifth in the first ever European Championship of American football in 1983.

 1983 (5th)
 1995 (3rd)
 2010 (3rd)
 2014 (2nd)
 2018 (2nd)
 2021 (5th)
 2023 TBD

IFAF World Championship record

Roster

Germany Austria series
In 2021 the German and Austrian governing bodies AFVD and AFBÖ announced their intention to hold recurring matchups between the two national teams every other year with the first to be held in 2022.

External links

References

Men's national American football teams
American football
American football in Austria
European Championship of American football